Brian Burke may refer to:

 Brian Burke (Australian politician) (born 1947), Australian politician and former premier of Western Australia
 Brian Burke (American politician) (born 1958), Wisconsin politician and legislator
 Brian Burke (ice hockey) (born 1955), American ice hockey executive and former general manager of the Toronto Maple Leafs
 Brian Burke (American football) (born 1935), former American football player and coach
 Brian Burke (Gaelic footballer) (born 1966), Irish retired Gaelic footballer

See also 
 Bryan Burke (born 1989), American soccer player